Schreiner Airways was a charter, passenger and cargo airline based in the Netherlands.

History
Schreiner was an offshore helicopter operator which was founded in 1945. The various flight operations were split amongst several companies of the Schreiner Aviation Group, such as Schreiner Airways, Schreiner North Sea Helicopters and Schreiner Aviation Training. The Schreiner Aviation Group was purchased by the CHC Helicopter Corporation in 2005 and Schreiner Airways became CHC Airways.

Flight operations in the 1960s
Having previously operated smaller aircraft types, Schreiner Aerocontractors NV acquired two Douglas DC-3 twin engined 28-seat airliners in 1963 and operated them on intra-European passenger and freight charter flights. The aircraft were disposed of in 1967.  Between April 1964 and December 1967 a total of six owned and leased Fokker Friendship twin-engined turboprop airliners were flown on European passenger flights. Three Douglas DC-7C long range airliners were operated on intercontinental charter flights between July 1965 and June 1968.

Schreiner Airways Cargo

The Schreiner group established a dedicated cargo operation in 1997 and leased a Lockheed C-130 Hercules freighter which operated cargo services for KLM Royal Dutch Airlines. The aircraft was returned to its owner in 1998. Three Airbus A300 jet freighters were acquired and flown for KLM on cargo services between 1999 and 2001, when this operation was terminated.

Code data
IATA Code: AW
ICAO Code: SCH
Callsign: SCHREINER

Fleet

As of August 2006 the Schreiner Airways fleet included:

2 ATR 72-200
4 Bombardier Dash 8 Q300
5 De Havilland Canada DHC-6 Twin Otter Series 300

Historical fleet
It had a fairly large fleet of aircraft and between 1999 and 2001 and also operated three Airbus A300 cargo aircraft on behalf of KLM.

Preserved Schreiner Airways aircraft
At the Aviodrome aviation museum on Lelystad Airport a retired Aérospatiale Dauphin 2 helicopter in Schreiner colors is on display.

Bibliography
Gradidge, Jennifer. Douglas DC-1, DC-2, DC-3 - The First Seventy Years, Volume 1. Air-Britain (Historians) Ltd. Tonbridge, Kent. 2006. .
 Roach, J and Eastwood A.B. Piston Engined Airliner Production List. The Aviation Hobby Shop. West Drayton, Middlesex. 2007. No ISBN.

References

External links

 
 

Defunct airlines of the Netherlands
Airlines established in 1945
Airlines disestablished in 2005
Dutch companies established in 1945
Dutch companies disestablished in 2005